This is a list of electoral results for the Electoral district of Marangaroo in Western Australian state elections from 1989 to 1996. The district was based in Perth's northern suburbs. It was a safe Labor seat.

History 
Marangaroo was first created for the 1989 state election and abolished ahead of the 1996 state election. The seat's member during its two terms was Labor MP Ted Cunningham. Cunningham was previously the member for Balga, which was abolished when Marangaroo was created. He went on to represent the new district of Girrawheen, which largely replaced Marangaroo.

Members for Marangaroo

Election results

Elections in the 1990s

Elections in the 1980s

References

Western Australian state electoral results by district